International Beverages Trading Company Group (abbreviated IBTC) is a major Myanmar-based beverage manufacturing company.

IBTC was founded in 1995 with 50 employees by Aung Moe Kyaw, the son-in-law of Thein Tun, chairman of the Myanmar Golden Star Group. It is known for its alcohol brands, including Grand Royal Whiskey, Royal Dry Gin, Eagle Whiskey, Grand Royal Special Reserve Whiskey, Hero Whiskey, and Golden Island Whiskey.

References

Manufacturing companies of Myanmar
Food and drink companies of Myanmar
Food and drink companies established in 1995
1995 establishments in Myanmar
Companies based in Yangon